E-flat major (or the key of E-flat) is a major scale based on E, consisting of the pitches E, F, G, A, B, C, and D. Its key signature has three flats. Its relative minor is C minor, and its parallel minor is E minor, (or enharmonically D minor).

The E-flat major scale is:

Characteristics 
The key of E-flat major is often associated with bold, heroic music, in part because of Beethoven's usage. His Eroica Symphony, Emperor Concerto and Grand Sonata are all in this key. Beethoven's (hypothetical) 10th Symphony is also in E-flat. But even before Beethoven, Francesco Galeazzi identified E-flat major as "a heroic key, extremely majestic, grave and serious: in all these features it is superior to that of C."

Three of Mozart's completed Horn Concertos and Joseph Haydn's Trumpet Concerto are in E-flat major, and so is Anton Bruckner's Fourth Symphony with its prominent horn theme in the first movement. Another notable heroic piece in the key of E-flat major is Richard Strauss's A Hero's Life. The heroic theme from the Jupiter movement of Holst's The Planets is in E-flat major. Mahler's vast and heroic Eighth Symphony is in E-flat and his Second Symphony also ends in this key.

However, in the Classical period, E-flat major was not limited to solely bombastic brass music. "E-flat was the key Haydn chose most often for [string] quartets, ten times in all, and in every other case he wrote the slow movement in the dominant, B-flat major." Or "when composing church music and operatic music in E-flat major, [Joseph] Haydn often substituted cors anglais for oboes in this period", and also in Symphony No. 22.

E-flat major was the flattest key Mozart used in his music. For him, E-flat major was associated with Freemasonry; "E-flat evoked stateliness and an almost religious character."

Edward Elgar wrote his Variation IX "Nimrod" from the Enigma Variations in E-flat major. Its strong, yet vulnerable character has led the piece to become a staple at funerals, especially in Great Britain.

Shostakovich used the E-flat major scale to sarcastically evoke military glory in his Symphony No. 9.

Well-known compositions in this key

 Johann Sebastian Bach
 Cello Suite No. 4, BWV 1010
 Prelude & Fugue in E-flat major "St. Anne", BWV 552
 Ludwig van Beethoven
 Septet for Strings and Woodwinds, Op. 20
 Symphony No. 3, Op. 55 "Eroica"
 Piano Concerto No. 5, Op. 73 "Emperor"
 Piano Sonata No. 4, Op. 7 "Grand Sonata"
 Piano Sonata No. 18, Op. 31/3 "The Hunt"
 Piano Sonata No. 26, Op. 81a "Les Adieux"
 Violin Sonata No. 3, Op. 12/3
 Piano Trio in E-flat major, Op.70 No.2
 Sextet for Horns and String Quartet, Op. 81b
 String Quartet No. 10, Op. 74
 String Quartet No. 12, Op. 127
Johannes Brahms
Intermezzo for piano op. 117/1
Rhapsody for piano op. 119/4
Clarinet Sonata op. 120/2
Horn trio op. 40
Max Bruch
 Scottish Fantasy in E-flat major, Op. 46
 Anton Bruckner
 Symphony No. 4, WAB 104 "Romantic"
 Frédéric Chopin
 Nocturne in E-flat, Op. 9, No. 2
 Étude in E-flat, Op. 10, No. 11
 Grande valse brillante, Op. 18
 Andante spianato et grande polonaise brillante, Op. 22
 Prelude in E-flat, Op. 28, No. 19
 Nocturne in E-flat, Op. 55, No. 2
Antonín Dvořák
 String Quartet Op. 51
 String Quintet Op. 97
Edward Elgar
 Variations on an Original Theme, Variation IX "Nimrod"
Joseph Haydn
 String Quartet Op. 33 No. 2, "The Joke"
 Symphony No. 22, Hob.I:22 "Philosopher"
 Symphony No. 103, Hob.I:103 "Drumroll"
 Trumpet Concerto, Hob.VIIe:1
 Piano Sonata in E-flat, No. 59, Hob.XVI/49
 Piano Sonata in E-flat, No. 62, Hob XVI/52
Franz Liszt
 Piano Concerto No. 1, S.124
 Transcendental Étude No. 7 "Eroica"
Gustav Mahler
 Symphony No. 8, "The Symphony of a Thousand"
Felix Mendelssohn
 Symphony for string orchestra No. 6
 Sonata for clarinet and piano
Octet, Op. 20
 String Quartet (unnumbered)
 String Quartet No. 5 Op. 44 No. 3
 Variations for piano, Op. Posth. 82
Wolfgang Amadeus Mozart
 Piano Concerto No. 9, K. 271 "Jeunehomme"
 Piano Concerto No. 10 for two pianos, K. 365/316a
 Piano Concerto No. 14, K. 449
 Quintet for Piano and Winds, K. 452
 Piano Concerto No. 22, K. 482
 Sinfonia Concertante for violin and viola, K. 364/320d
 Symphony No. 39, K. 543
 Franz Schubert
 Impromptu in E-flat, Op. 90 No. 2
Piano Trio No. 2 (Schubert)
 Robert Schumann
 Symphony No. 3, Op. 97 "Rhenish"
 Piano Quintet, Op. 44
 Piano Quartet Op. 47
 Dmitri Shostakovich
 Cello Concerto No. 1, Op. 107
 Symphony No. 9, Op. 70
 Jean Sibelius
 Symphony No. 5, Op. 82
 John Philip Sousa
 The Stars and Stripes Forever
 Pyotr Ilyich Tchaikovsky
 1812 Overture, Op. 49
 Richard Wagner
Prelude to Das Rheingold

Notes

External links

Musical keys
Major scales